Michael Conrad "Joey" Carew (15 September 1937 – 8 January 2011) was a West Indian cricketer who played in 19 Tests from 1963 to 1972.  

An opening batsman and off-spin bowler Carew's sole Test century came against New Zealand at Eden Park in 1969. The previous year he put on 119 for the first wicket with Steve Camacho against England at Queen's Park Oval. Carew captained Trinidad and Tobago and was the first man to take the side to back-to-back Shell Shield titles. Carew went on to serve as a selector for West Indies cricket for 20 years, in three separate stints, retiring from the post in 2006. He was known to be a mentor to Brian Lara, whom he took in as a young teen.  Christopher Martin-Jenkins once wrote of Carew: "Perhaps his greatest legacy to West Indies cricket, however, lies in the advice and encouragement he gave to a young left-hander from Santa Cruz in Trinidad. Brian Lara rewarded Joey Carew richly for the interest he showed in him." 

Carew lived throughout his life in the Woodbrook section of Port of Spain, not far from the house in which he was born and raised. He attended Fatima College. In addition to his passion for cricket, he was a fan of horse-racing.  His two sons are Michael Carew, a trainer for Trinidadian horse racing, and David Carew, a banker.  Carew died aged 73 from arteriosclerosis.

References

External links
 
 

1937 births
2011 deaths
West Indies Test cricketers
West Indies cricket team selectors
Cricketers from Port of Spain
Trinidad and Tobago cricketers
North Trinidad cricketers
Trinidad and Tobago cricket coaches